DZLT (1188 AM) Radyo Pilipino is a radio station owned and operated by Radyo Pilipino Media Group through its licensee Radio Corporation of the Philippines. Its studio and transmitter are located in Brgy. Ibabang Dupay, Lucena City, Quezon. It has the distinction of being the oldest radio station in southern Luzon and it is one of the RCP-owned stations that have affiliated with the Radio Mindanao Network, together with DWPR in Dagupan and DXOC in Ozamiz.

DZLT's transmitter was knocked down twice by typhoons: the most recent one by Typhoon Xangsane (Milenyo) in 2006.

References

Radio stations in Lucena, Philippines
Radio stations established in 1960
1960 establishments in the Philippines